The 1951 Wyoming Cowboys football team was an American football team that represented the University of Wyoming as a member of the Skyline Conference during the 1951 college football season.  In their fifth season under head coach Bowden Wyatt, the Cowboys compiled a 7–2–1 record (5–1–1 against Skyline opponents), finished second in the conference, and outscored opponents by a total of 220 to 82.

Schedule

References

Wyoming
Wyoming Cowboys football seasons
Wyoming Cowboys football